The Springfield, Missouri, metropolitan area, as defined by the United States Census Bureau, is an area consisting of five counties in southwestern Missouri, anchored by the city of Springfield, the state's third largest city. Other primary population centers in the metro area include Nixa, Ozark, Republic, Bolivar, Marshfield and Willard. Currently, the city limits of Springfield reach the Ozark city limits at the Christian County line on US 65, the city limits of Republic at James River Freeway on the southwest side of the city, and the Strafford city limits on Route 744 on the northeast side of the city.

As of the 2020 census, the MSA (Metropolitan Statistical Area) had a population of 475,432 and was the fastest growing metro area in the state of Missouri. The area is home to several centers for higher education, including Missouri State University, Drury University and Southwest Baptist University. The Springfield region serves as the headquarters for various companies and organizations, including Bass Pro Shops, BKD, LLP, O'Reilly Auto Parts, Jack Henry & Associates, Andy's Frozen Custard and CoxHealth, and also serves as an important location for JPMorgan Chase, Expedia and American Airlines. As of 2019, the Springfield metro had a GDP of US$20.8 billion, the third largest in Missouri.

Counties

Communities

Anchor cities
 Springfield Pop: 169,176
 Nixa Pop: 23,257
 Ozark Pop: 21,284

Places with 5,000 to 20,000 inhabitants
 Republic Pop: 18,750
 Bolivar Pop: 11,067
 Marshfield Pop: 7,458
Willard Pop: 6,344
 Battlefield Pop: 5,990

Places with 1,000 to 5,000 inhabitants

 Rogersville Pop: 3,374
 Buffalo Pop: 3,040
 Clever pop: 2,517
 Strafford Pop: 2,361
 Seymour Pop: 1,967
 Sparta Pop: 1,792
 Merriam Woods Pop: 1,742
 Fair Grove Pop: 1,582
 Ash Grove Pop: 1,512
 Crane Pop: 1,410
 Shell Knob (partial; census-designated place) Pop: 1,379
 Kissee Mills (census-designated place) Pop: 1,109
 Billings Pop: 1,083
 Humansville Pop: 1,036

Places with 500 to 1,000 inhabitants
 Highlandville Pop: 915
 Reeds Spring Pop: 886
 Rockaway Beach Pop: 857
 Fremont Hills Pop: 847
 Fordland Pop: 801
 Walnut Grove Pop: 723
 Pleasant Hope Pop: 614
 Bull Creek Pop: 590
 Indian Point Pop: 520

Places with less than 500 inhabitants

 Fair Play Pop: 475
 Galena Pop: 422
 Urbana Pop: 411
 Niangua Pop: 403
 Taneyville Pop: 398
 Morrisville Pop: 381
 Diggins Pop: 295
 Saddlebrooke Pop: 230
 McCord Bend Pop: 283
 Kirbyville Pop: 204
 Spokane (census-designated place) Pop: 177
 Hurley Pop: 173
 Halfway Pop: 173
 Blue Eye Pop: 160
 Flemington Pop: 148
 Louisburg Pop: 122
 Aldrich Pop: 80
 Coney Island Pop: 73
 Goodnight Pop: 18

Unincorporated places

 Boaz
 Bois D'Arc
 Brighton
 Bruner
 Celt
 Chadwick
 Charity
 Chestnutridge
 Dunnegan
 Ebenezer
 Elkhead
 Elkland

 Eudora
 Garrison
 Glidewell
 Goodson
 Keltner
 Linden
 Logan
 Long Lane
 Northview
 Oak Grove Heights
 Oldfield
 Plano

 Polk
 Red Top
 Red Top
 Spokane
 Tin Town
 Tunas
 Turners
 Windyville
 Bradleyville
 Brownbranch
 Cape Fair
 Carr Lane

 Cedar Creek
 Crossroads
 Elsey
 Hilda
 Lampe
 McClurg
 Point Lookout
 Ponce de Leon
 Powersite
 Protem
 Reeds Spring Junction
 Ridgedale

 Rueter
 Table Rock
 Union City
 Viola (partial)
 Walnut Shade

School systems
 Billings R-IV School District
 Bolivar R-1 School District
 Chadwick School District
 Clever R-V School District
 Dallas Co. R-1 School District
 Fair Grove R-10 School District
 Greenwood Laboratory School
 Logan-Rogersville R-VIII School District
 Marian C Early R-V (Morrisville) School District
 Nixa R-II School District
 Ozark R-VI School District
 Pleasant Hope R-VI School District
 Republic R-III School District
 Spokane R-VII School District
 Springfield Catholic Schools
 Springfield R-12 School District
 Strafford R-VI School District
 Walnut Grove R-V School District
 Willard R-2 School District

Economy 
Springfield is the headquarters for O'Reilly Auto Parts, the only Fortune 500 company based in the region. It also houses the headquarters for Bass Pro Shops, CoxHealth, Andy's Frozen Custard, BKD, LLP and Jack Henry & Associates. The Springfield–Branson National Airport serves as a base for American Airlines and Envoy Air as the airline utilizes the airport as a maintenance base. Springfield is also an important region for call centers, with Expedia, Chase and AT&T maintaining call centers in the city.

Media 
Springfield serves as the center of the Springfield media market, the 75th largest media market in the country ranked amongst Omaha, Nebraska and Rochester, New York. There are nearly 430,000 television owning homes and a total population of 1,065,000 people.

Print 
The main newspaper for the area is the Springfield News-Leader. The area is also served by the Springfield Business Journal and 417 magazine as well as its specialized magazines including 417 Biz.

Surrounding areas are served by their own newspapers as well, Christian County communities are served by Headliner News, Marshfield by The Marshfield Mail, and Bolivar by the Herald Free-Press.

Broadcast 
Television stations in the Springfield metro area include:

 KYTV channel 3, NBC
 KRBK channel 5, Fox
 KOLR channel 10, CBS
 KYCW channel 15, The CW
 KOZK channel 21, PBS
 KOZL channel 27, MyNetworkTV
 KSPR channel 33, ABC

Education

Secondary

Springfield Public Schools is the largest fully accredited school district in the State of Missouri with nearly 25,000 students and a graduation rate of roughly 88%. Nixa Public Schools, located just south of Springfield, is a growing district of 6,000 students that frequently ranks above the national average in ACT scores and has for the last ten years earned the highest state recognition for academic achievement given in Missouri. Other growing districts in the area are located in the cities of Ozark, Republic, Strafford, and Marshfield. Private schools in the area include the Greenwood Laboratory School in Springfield, located on the Missouri State campus, and the Summit Preparatory School, located near James River Freeway in Chesterfield Village.

There are also several private religious schools in the area, including Springfield Catholic and Springfield Lutheran.

Colleges and universities
Missouri State University in Springfield is the second largest university in the state with roughly 23,697 in 2019. Other universities in Springfield include Drury University, a private liberal arts college with more than 1,000 students, and OTC with approximately 11,000 students, where students can earn a one-year certificate or a two-year associate degree.

Transportation

Principal Highways
  – East to St. Louis and west to  Tulsa
  – East to Louisville and west to Monett
  – South to Little Rock and north to Des Moines
  – West to Wichita
  – North to Kansas City
  – Between Nixa and Ozark
  – Between Strafford and Rogersville

Air

The area is served by Springfield-Branson National Airport which has direct flights on Delta, United, American and Allegiant to thirteen cities across the United States, including hubs such as Chicago, Dallas, Atlanta, Charlotte and Houston, among others. With over one million passengers per year prior to the COVID-19 pandemic, it is one of the fastest growing airports of its size in the country. A new terminal was opened at the airport in 2007 with 10 gates, expandable to 60, and runways can accommodate the Boeing 747 and large military aircraft.

Springfield has a secondary, smaller airport, Downtown Airport which is not served by any passenger airlines and is used mostly by smaller general aviation airplanes.

Public transportation
Public transportation in the metropolitan area is focused primarily in Springfield. City Utilities of Springfield operates Springfield Transit Services, operating many buses on several different routes throughout the city, and bus service is available 365 days per year with less frequent weekend, holiday and evening routes.

Greenways

The area has a growing number of Greenway trails, 70 miles (112 km) run through parks and green areas, while 81 miles (130 km) are located on city streets. Such routes include The Link, which runs on local roads through the city of Springfield, and the Trail of Tears Link, while the Frisco Link connects Springfield with Bolivar to the north.

References

 
Metropolitan areas of Missouri